Warnbro Sound Avenue is a main road and suburban distributor in the southern suburbs of Rockingham south of Perth, and runs through or alongside the suburbs of Warnbro, Port Kennedy and Secret Harbour, ending at Dampier Drive in Golden Bay where it links to Mandurah Road. It continues on from Read Street and links these suburbs to the Rockingham City shopping centre. It is a dual carriageway until just before it ends in Golden Bay.

The Warnbro Fair shopping centre is also located on this road, as is Warnbro Community High School. Most of the road was built in the 1990s and 2000s to service growing suburban demand.

Major intersections

 Halliburton Drive (at Warnbro Fair Shopping Centre)
 Port Kennedy Drive
 Anstey Road/Secret Harbour Boulevard (Secret Harbour)
 Dampier Drive (Golden Bay)

See also

References 

Roads in Perth, Western Australia
City of Rockingham